Monocercops nepalensis is a moth of the family Gracillariidae. It is known from Nepal.

The wingspan is 6.2–9.5 mm.

The larvae feed on Castanopsis indica. They mine the leaves of their host plant.

References

Acrocercopinae
Moths described in 1989